Bilobol is an alkylresorcinol from Ginkgo biloba.  Chemically, it is similar in structure to urushiol, the irritant found in poison ivy; it is a strong skin irritant itself.

Natural occurrences 
Bilobol can be found in Ginkgo biloba fruits.

References 

Alkylresorcinols